Baker Ropp House is a historic home located at Martinsburg, Berkeley County, West Virginia USA. It was built between 1890 and 1892, and is an "L"-shaped, two-story, brick Queen Anne-style dwelling. It is five bays wide, has a gable roof, and sits on a fieldstone foundation. It features a two-story, polygonal brick window bay and two-story frame porch.  Also on the property are a brick smokehouse (1890-1892) and privy / shed (1890-1892).

It was listed on the National Register of Historic Places in 2002.

References

Houses on the National Register of Historic Places in West Virginia
Queen Anne architecture in West Virginia
Houses completed in 1890
Houses in Berkeley County, West Virginia
National Register of Historic Places in Martinsburg, West Virginia
Buildings and structures in Martinsburg, West Virginia